USS Constant (AM-86) was  an  of the United States Navy. Laid down on 21 February 1942 by the Commercial Iron Works, Portland, Oregon, and launched on 9 May 1942, the ship was commissioned on 21 September 1942.

World War II Pacific Theatre operations
From 20 December 1942 to 4 March 1943 Constant escorted convoys between San Francisco, California, and Pearl Harbor. She sailed from Pearl Harbor 8 March for Espiritu Santo, arriving 25 March for local escort duty, operating from Espiritu Santo and Noumea in support of the Guadalcanal operation.

On 3 September 1943 she arrived at Tulagi and remained in the Solomons on inter-island escort and minesweeping duty with occasional convoy voyages to Nouméa and Espiritu Santo until 3 April 1944, when she steamed to Auckland, New Zealand, for a brief overhaul. She returned to Port Purvis on Florida Island in the Solomons 13 May.

Reclassified as a submarine chaser 
On 1 June 1944 her name was canceled and she was reclassified as a submarine chaser PC-1590. She continued her service at Espiritu Santo, Nouméa, Samoa and Tongatapu until 6 May 1946.

Post-war activity 
She then returned to Pearl Harbor, where she was decommissioned 19 June 1946. Assigned to the 14th Naval District for Naval Reserve training 28 October 1946, PC-1590 was placed in commission in reserve 5 May 1950, and in full commission from 20 March 1951 until decommissioned 22 October 1954. She was sunk as a target.

References

External links 
 

 

Adroit-class minesweepers
Ships built in Portland, Oregon
1942 ships
World War II minesweepers of the United States
World War II patrol vessels of the United States
Ships sunk as targets